Anne Azza Aly (born Azza Mahmoud Fawzi Hosseini Ali el Serougi, 1967) is an Australian politician who has been a Labor member of the House of Representatives since the 2016 election, representing the electorate of Cowan in Western Australia. Aly is currently the Minister for Early Childhood Education and Minister for Youth in the Albanese ministry.

Aly is the first female federal parliamentarian of Islamic faith and one of Australia's first two government ministers to be Muslim.

Aly was a professor, lecturer and academic specialising in counter-terrorism, and she is considered a global authority on understanding how and why young people are drawn into violent extremism. Aly founded People Against Violent Extremism (PaVE) to address extremism in Australia.

Early life and education
Aly was born in Alexandria, Egypt on 29 March 1967. Her mother was a nurse and her father an engineer. When Aly was two years old she and her parents moved to Australia via an assisted migration program, living first in Queensland, before settling in the western Sydney suburbs Lakemba and Chipping Norton, where Aly attended a private Anglican girls' school, Meriden, and her parents worked in factories and as a bus driver.

Aly returned to Egypt for university, then returned to Australia with her first husband to raise their children in Perth close to her retired parents.

Aly graduated from the American University in Cairo in 1990 with a Bachelor of Arts degree with high honours in English Literature, with a minor in Acting; and in 1994, received a Graduate Diploma of Arts (Language Studies) from Edith Cowan University; followed by a Master of Education degree in 1996, and PhD in 2008, both from Edith Cowan University. Her PhD thesis focused on media and culture, and was entitled A study of audience responses to the media discourse about the 'Other': The Fear of Terrorism between Australian Muslims and the Broader Community.

Aly is one of eleven MPs in the 46th Parliament of Australia who possesses a PhD, the others being Katie Allen, Fiona Martin, Jim Chalmers, Andrew Leigh, Daniel Mulino, Jess Walsh, Adam Bandt, Mehreen Faruqi, Anne Webster and Helen Haines.

Early career
While studying, Aly worked part-time teaching English to migrants. In 2001 Aly became a policy officer for the Government of Western Australia, where she worked in education and multicultural affairs policy from 2000 to 2007, including as a senior policy officer in the Office of Multicultural Interests from 2003. After the September 11 attacks in the US she worked on Western Australia's response to the Federal Government's counter-terrorism action plan.

From 2007 to 2008, Aly worked for the Equal Opportunity Commission WA.

Aly operated her own policy consulting firm from 2011.

Academic career
Aly lectured in counter-terrorism and security at Edith Cowan University from 2009 to 2011, and then at Curtin University from 2011. She was appointed associate professor at Curtin in 2014, and Professor at Edith Cowan in 2015. Aly is an active member of Curtin University's The Centre for Culture and Technology, leading its Countering Online Violent Extremism research program. Aly has written published academic papers, books and newspaper articles on terrorist recruitment and counter-messaging and the involvement of former white supremacists in speaking out against violent extremism.

In 2008, Aly received the Dean's Award for Best New Researcher from Edith Cowan University. In 2009, she won a Publication Award from the Australian Institute of Professional Intelligence Officers, and she was appointed to the Council for Australian Arab Relations at Department of Foreign Affairs and Trade, and remained on the board for six years.

In 2011, she was inducted into the Western Australian Women's Hall of Fame.

Aly's research has been funded by the Australian Research Council's Safeguarding Australia Initiative. In 2011, former prime minister Kevin Rudd launched Aly's first book, Terrorism & Global Security: Historical and Contemporary Perspectives.

In 2013, Aly founded a youth-led not-for-profit organisation, People Against Violent Extremism (PaVE), to address extremism in Australia. PaVE received a $115,000 grant from the federal Attorney-General's Department to develop videos to counter extremism, and in 2015, Aly announced that PaVE had raised $40,800 for a mentoring program for young activists. The mentoring program includes training through MyHack, which trains university students to brainstorm and develop counter-messaging to extremist propaganda online.

In 2015, Aly was the only Australian invited to address Barack Obama's Countering Violent Extremism summit at the White House.

In 2016, Aly was nominated for Australian of the Year.

Political career 
Aly was preselected as the Labor candidate for Cowan for the 2016 federal election and was successful in winning the seat from the incumbent, Luke Simpkins, with a 5.2% swing, by a margin of 0.68 points.

During the 2016 election campaign, Liberal Party Justice Minister Michael Keenan was accused of starting a smear campaign against Aly in regards to her previous counter-terrorism work at PaVE. Julie Bishop, Mathias Cormann, John Howard, and Luke Simpkins followed Keenan's lead. However, prior to Aly becoming a Labor candidate, Simpkins had written to Aly in 2015 to convey his admiration for her counter-terrorism work including "content of your media interviews and approach to the threat of radicalisation", and Aly's work had been actively supported by the Coalition government.

In 2016, after speaking against comments from Immigration Minister Peter Dutton regarding Lebanese Muslim immigration, Aly was subject to a series of online attacks and death threats directed at her family. Several comments were reported to the Australian Federal Police’s Protection Liaison Unit, but no arrests where made.

In 2017, Aly was the victim of a fake-news attack claiming that she refused to lay a wreath at an ANZAC Day service in Perth. The story was promulgated by the Love Australia or Leave Party. Aly asserted that she was "insulted by the allegation she refused to lay a wreath". The leader of the Love Australia or Leave Party later apologized for the social media post and the inaccuracy of the information.

During the 2019 federal election campaign, unauthorised anonymous flyers were distributed in the Cowan electorate targeting Aly with unsubstantiated claims including that she supports policies that were "like Saudi Arabia". The Labor Party condemned the flyers as "racist". This follows anti-Muslim Facebook posts from Queensland Senator Fraser Anning who co-opted an image of a Muslim family taken in 2005 when their 19-month-old daughter Rahma went missing from their Sydney home, along with the words "If you want a Muslim for a neighbour, just vote Labor". Rahma has never been found.

Aly was reelected in the 2019 federal election with a slightly increased margin of 1.6%.

In August of 2019, a man armed with a knife was arrested at Aly's offices in Cowan. According to Aly the man did not make an outright threat but was brandishing "a fairly large kitchen knife".

Aly has stated she believes in marriage equality, is economically conservative and "more left" on social policies, believes in a strict separation of church and state, defends the rights of women to wear a hijab if they choose though she does not wear one herself, and that she demonstrated against the Iraq war. In her maiden speech, Aly highlighted the growing income disparity and her intention to bring the benefits of growth to every suburb.

Following Labor being elected to government at the 2022 federal election, Aly was appointed Minister for Early Childhood Education and Youth. She also benefited from a statewide swing in Western Australia to the Labor Party, receiving a swing in her seat of Cowan of just under 10%, making it a safe Labor seat.

Personal life
Aly is a three-times-married mother of two boys. Her current husband is a former police officer and Canadian ice hockey player David Allen.

In interviews and Aly's 2018 autobiography, Finding My Place, she discusses the domestic abuse she suffered at the hands of her first husband, the pressure she was under to stay with him, and the struggles to raise her sons as a single mother after divorce.

Bibliography

See also
 Radicalization
 United Nations Security Council Counter-Terrorism Committee
 Against Violent Extremism
 Counter Extremism Project

References

External links
 Opinion pieces on the Guardian
 Articles in The Conversation
 Opinion pieces on ABC's The Drum

1967 births
Living people
Terrorism theorists
Counterterrorism in Australia
Academic staff of Curtin University
Australian Muslims
21st-century Australian writers
21st-century Australian women writers
Australian women social scientists
Political philosophers
Australian women philosophers
Australian philosophers
Australian Labor Party members of the Parliament of Australia
Members of the Australian House of Representatives
Members of the Australian House of Representatives for Cowan
Egyptian emigrants to Australia
Labor Left politicians
21st-century Australian politicians
Women members of the Australian House of Representatives
21st-century Australian women politicians